Mbukushu is a traditional Kavango kingdom in what is today Namibia. Its people speak the Mbukushu language.

References 
 World Statesmen.org
 Maria Fisch, The Mbukushu in Angola (1730-2002):A History of Migration, Flight and Royal Rainmaking,Colónia/Alemanha: Koeppe Verlag, 2005

History of Namibia
Kavango Region

Former countries in Africa